Suryapet is a constituency of Telangana Legislative Assembly that includes the city of Suryapet. This constituency is currently held by Telangana Rashtra Samithi leader Guntakandla Jagadish Reddy. It is one of the 4 constituencies in the Suryapet district. The Suryapet assembly constituency is part of the Nalgonda Lok Sabha constituency since 2009.

Extent of the constituency
The Suryapet Assembly Constituency comprises the following Mandals:

Members of the Legislative Assembly

Election results

2018

2014

Majority : 2,219

2009

See also
List of constituencies of Telangana Legislative Assembly

References 

Assembly constituencies of Telangana
Assembly constituencies of Nalgonda district